The Canal Street station is a New York City Subway station complex. It is located in the Manhattan neighborhoods of Chinatown and SoHo, and is shared by the BMT Broadway Line, the IRT Lexington Avenue Line, and the BMT Nassau Street Line. It is served by the 6, J, N, and Q trains at all times; the R train at all times except late nights; the W train during weekdays; the <6> train during weekdays in the peak direction; the Z train during rush hours in the peak direction; and the 4 train during late nights.

The complex comprises four stations, all named Canal Street; the Broadway Line's local and express tracks stop at separate sets of platforms. The Lexington Avenue Line platforms were built for the Interborough Rapid Transit Company (IRT), and was a local station on the city's first subway line. The station opened on October 27, 1904, as one of the original 28 stations of the New York City Subway. The other three stations were built for the Brooklyn Rapid Transit Company (later the Brooklyn–Manhattan Transit Corporation, or BRT) as part of the Dual Contracts. The Nassau Street Line station opened on August 4, 1913; the Broadway Line express station opened on September 4, 1917; and the Broadway Line local station opened on January 5, 1918. The IRT station was connected to the BMT stations in 1978. Several modifications have been made over the years, including a full renovation between 1999 and 2004.

The Lexington Avenue Line station, under Lafayette Street, has two side platforms and four tracks; express trains use the inner two tracks to bypass the station. The Nassau Street Line station, under Centre Street, has two island platforms and three tracks, but only one platform and two tracks are in use. The Broadway local station, under Broadway, has two side platforms and four tracks, the inner two of which are not in use. The Broadway express station, under Canal Street, has two side platforms and two tracks, running at a lower level than the other three sets of platforms. The Lexington Avenue Line platforms contain elevators from the street, which make it compliant with the Americans with Disabilities Act of 1990, but the other platforms do not have elevator access.

History

First subway 
Planning for a subway line in New York City dates to 1864. However, development of what would become the city's first subway line did not start until 1894, when the New York State Legislature authorized the Rapid Transit Act. The subway plans were drawn up by a team of engineers led by William Barclay Parsons, chief engineer of the Rapid Transit Commission. It called for a subway line from New York City Hall in lower Manhattan to the Upper West Side, where two branches would lead north into the Bronx. A plan was formally adopted in 1897, and all legal conflicts concerning the route alignment were resolved near the end of 1899. The Rapid Transit Construction Company, organized by John B. McDonald and funded by August Belmont Jr., signed the initial Contract 1 with the Rapid Transit Commission in February 1900, in which it would construct the subway and maintain a 50-year operating lease from the opening of the line. In 1901, the firm of Heins & LaFarge was hired to design the underground stations. Belmont incorporated the Interborough Rapid Transit Company (IRT) in April 1902 to operate the subway.

The Canal Street station was constructed as part of the route segment from Chambers Street to Great Jones Street. Construction on this section of the line began on July 10, 1900, and was awarded to Degnon-McLean Contracting Company. Near Canal Street the subway passed through quicksand and a drainage sewer; this was near the location of the old Collect Pond. The sewer, built to drain the Collect Pond, originally continued west to the Hudson River; with the IRT's construction, the sewer was redirected east into the East River. The new brick sewer was circular and measured five and a half feet across. Pumps were used to keep the excavation clear of water while the work proceeded. By late 1903, the subway was nearly complete, but the IRT Powerhouse and the system's electrical substations were still under construction, delaying the system's opening.

The Canal Street station opened on October 27, 1904, as one of the original 28 stations of the New York City Subway from City Hall to 145th Street on the Broadway–Seventh Avenue Line. After the first subway line was completed in 1908, the station was served by local trains along both the West Side (now the Broadway–Seventh Avenue Line to Van Cortlandt Park–242nd Street) and East Side (now the Lenox Avenue Line). West Side local trains had their southern terminus at City Hall during rush hours and South Ferry at other times, and had their northern terminus at 242nd Street. East Side local trains ran from City Hall to Lenox Avenue (145th Street).

To address overcrowding, in 1909, the New York Public Service Commission proposed lengthening platforms at stations along the original IRT subway. As part of a modification to the IRT's construction contracts, made on January 18, 1910, the company was to lengthen station platforms to accommodate ten-car express and six-car local trains. In addition to $1.5 million (equivalent to $ million in ) spent on platform lengthening, $500,000 was spent on building additional entrances and exits. It was anticipated that these improvements would increase capacity by 25 percent. Both platforms were extended to the north and south. Six-car local trains began operating in October 1910.

Dual Contracts 
After the original IRT opened, the city began planning new lines. The Centre Street Loop (later the Nassau Street Line), approved on January 25, 1907, as a four-track line, was to connect the Brooklyn Bridge, Manhattan Bridge, and Williamsburg Bridge via Centre Street, Canal Street, and Delancey Street. Construction contracts for the Nassau Street Line were awarded in early 1907. The New York Public Service Commission also adopted plans for what was known as the Broadway–Lexington Avenue route (later the Broadway Main Line) on December 31, 1907. A proposed Tri-borough system was adopted in early 1908, combining the Broadway–Lexington Avenue and Nassau Street lines; a Canal Street subway from the Fourth Avenue Subway in Brooklyn via the Manhattan Bridge to the Hudson River; and several other lines in Brooklyn. The lines were assigned to the Brooklyn Rapid Transit Company (BRT) in the Dual Contracts, adopted on March 4, 1913. The IRT made a failed proposal for the Canal Street subway in 1909.

The Centre Street Loop station, including a bridge over the Canal Street subway, was completed at the end of 1909. The station remained closed because the Chambers Street station, the terminal for the Centre Street Loop, was not complete. The BRT submitted a proposal to the Commission, dated March 2, 1911, to operate the Tri-borough system (but under Church Street instead of Greenwich Street), as well as a branch along Broadway, Seventh Avenue, and 59th Street from Ninth Street north and east to the Queensboro Bridge. The Canal Street subway was to merge with the Broadway Line instead of continuing to the Hudson River. In the old plan, the Broadway Main Line's center tracks were to have continued up Broadway, fed by traffic from Brooklyn and the Montague Street Tunnel. Local service was to have terminated at the upper level of the Broadway Line's City Hall station, with express service using City Hall's upper level. The new plan favored local service via City Hall's upper level and express service via the Manhattan Bridge; the center tracks of the Main Line station were abandoned, as they would feed into the unused lower level platforms at City Hall. Two segments of the Broadway Line around Canal Street were placed under contract early in 1912. The contract for Section 2, between Murray Street and Canal Street, was awarded to the Degnon Contracting Company that January. Two months later, the contract for Section 2A, between Canal and Howard Streets, was contracted to the O'Rourke Engineering Construction Company.

The Nassau Street Line platforms opened on August 4, 1913, providing service to northern Brooklyn via the Williamsburg Bridge. The Bridge Line platforms opened on September 4, 1917, as part of the first section of the Broadway Line from Canal Street to 14th Street–Union Square. On January 5, 1918, the Main Line platforms opened when the Broadway Line was extended north to Times Square–42nd Street and south to Rector Street. The Lexington Avenue Line opened north of Grand Central–42nd Street in 1918, thereby dividing the original line into an "H"-shaped system. All local trains were sent via the Lexington Avenue Line, running along the Pelham Line in the Bronx. 

In December 1922, the Transit Commission approved a $3 million project to lengthen platforms at 14 local stations along the original IRT line, including Canal Street and seven other stations on the Lexington Avenue Line. The commission postponed the platform-lengthening project in September 1923, at which point the cost had risen to $5.6 million.

Modifications and transfers 
The city government took over the BMT's operations on June 1, 1940, and the IRT's operations on June 12, 1940. In April 1960, work began on a $3,509,000 project (equivalent to $ million in ) to lengthen platforms at seven of these stations to accommodate ten-car trains.

In the late 1960s, New York City Transit extended the Broadway Main Line platforms for ten-car trains. The Broadway Main Line and Bridge Line stations were overhauled in the late 1970s. The original trim lines were replaced with white cinderblock tiles, except for small recesses in the walls, which contained blue-painted cinderblock tiles. The staircases were repaired and new platform edges were installed. The blue cinderblock field contained the station-name signs and white text pointing to the exits. The renovation also replaced incandescent lighting with fluorescent lighting.

On January 16, 1978, the transfer between the Lexington Avenue Line and the BMT platforms was placed inside fare control.

With the exception of three months in 1990, train service to the Bridge Line platforms was suspended from 1988 to 2001 during the Manhattan Bridge reconstruction project. The platforms remained open for passengers transferring between the other routes, since they were the only connections between the other platforms in the complex. Service between Manhattan and Brooklyn was redirected to the Main Line platforms and used the Montague Street Tunnel. The three-month period was supposed to have allowed train service while work on the bridge was not being done, but on December 27, 1990, the discovery of missing steel plates and corrosion that threatened the bridge's integrity halted this service. In 1997, a temporary art exhibit known as the Canal Street Canal by Alexander Brodsky, was installed on the northbound trackway. It consisted of a large waterproof tub filled with water, with Venetian canal boats floating inside.

The complex was fully renovated between 1999 and 2004. The original mosaics on the Broadway Main Line were uncovered but then either removed or covered over again. One of the original tablets has been preserved at the New York Transit Museum. In 2001, the Broadway Main Line station received a major overhaul before the Bridge level reopened on July 22, 2001. Among the repairs included the staircases, re-tiling for the walls, new tiling on the floors, upgrading the station's lights and the public address system, installing ADA yellow safety treads along the platform edges, new signs, and new track beds in both directions. During the renovation, elevators were installed to the Lexington Avenue Line platforms, making them compliant with the Americans with Disabilities Act of 1990.

Station layout

The complex consists of four originally separate stations joined by underground passageways. Three of the four are perpendicular to Canal Street, crossing at Broadway (Broadway Main Line), Lafayette Street (Lexington Avenue Line) and Centre Street (Nassau Street Line). The Broadway-Manhattan Bridge Line platforms are directly underneath Canal Street itself. The Bridge Line platforms serve as transfer passageways between all other lines. After leaving Canal Street, the Manhattan Bridge Line makes a hard right onto Broadway.

Some relative depths of the stations in the Canal Street complex are as follows:
 BMT Broadway Line, main branch, 
 BMT Nassau Street Line, 
 BMT Broadway Line, Manhattan Bridge branch,

Exits
The complex has a total of 13 staircase entrances and 2 separate elevator entrances for the Lexington Avenue Line's platforms. From the Broadway Main Line platforms, there are two staircases to each of the northwestern, southeastern, and southwestern corners. There is also a staircase to the northeastern corner of Broadway and Canal Street. There is a staircase from the Nassau Street Line to the southwestern corner of Centre Street and Canal Street. The Broadway Bridge Line platform exits are also used by the Lexington Avenue Line platforms. Three staircases from the northbound Lexington Avenue Line platform lead to the eastern corners of Lafayette Street and Canal Street, with one to the northeast corner and two to the southeast corner. From the southbound Lexington Avenue Line platform there are staircases to the western corners of Lafayette Street and Canal Street. There are two elevators that make the Lexington Avenue Line station ADA-accessible. The northbound platform's elevator leads to the northeastern corner of that intersection, while the southbound platform's elevator leads to the northwestern corner.

Because the elevators are outside fare control, there is no free ADA-accessible transfer between the northbound and the southbound platforms; however, both of the IRT platforms are connected to the BMT Bridge Line platforms, and thus to each other and to the rest of the complex, via stairways.

The BMT Nassau Street Line platforms had two additional exits. One exit was accessible only from the now-abandoned eastern platform and had two staircases to the southeastern corner of Canal Street and Centre Street. The other exit, now converted to an emergency exit and crew rooms, is accessible from the passageway to the abandoned platform from the northbound BMT Broadway Line express platform. This exit leads to the northeastern corner of Canal Street and Centre Street, and features a provision for an escalator.

IRT Lexington Avenue Line platforms 

The Canal Street station on the IRT Lexington Avenue Line is a local station that has four tracks and two side platforms. The 6 stops here at all times, rush-hour and midday <6> trains stop here in the peak direction; and the 4 stops here during late nights. The two express tracks are used by the 4 and 5 trains during daytime hours. The platform extensions are at the north ends of the original platforms.

As with other stations built as part of the original IRT, the station was constructed using a cut-and-cover method. The tunnel is covered by a "U"-shaped trough that contains utility pipes and wires. Each platform consists of  concrete slabs, beneath which are drainage basins. The platforms contain columns with white glazed tiles,  spaced every . Additional columns between the tracks, spaced every , support the jack-arched concrete station roofs. There is a  gap between the trough wall and the platform walls, which are made of -thick brick covered over by a tiled finish.

The original decorative scheme consisted of blue/green tile station-name tablets, green tile bands, a buff terracotta cornice, and green terracotta plaques. The mosaic tiles at all original IRT stations were manufactured by the American Encaustic Tile Company, which subcontracted the installations at each station. The decorative work was performed by tile contractor Manhattan Glass Tile Company and terracotta contractor Atlantic Terra Cotta Company. The ceilings of the original platforms and fare control areas contain plaster molding. The newer portion has 1950s green tile at the end of the platforms. There are also Independent Subway System (IND)-type "To Canal Street" signs. New lights were installed. Non-original name tables and small "C" mosaics exist.

Image gallery

BMT Nassau Street Line platforms 

The Canal Street station on the BMT Nassau Street Line has three tracks and two island platforms, but only the western island platform is accessible to passengers. The J stops here at all times and the Z stops here during rush hours in the peak direction.

Formerly, Canal Street resembled a typical express station, except that the inner tracks dead-ended at bumper blocks at the south end with a platform-level connection joining the southern ends of the two platforms. These stub-end tracks were last used prior to 1994, when the station served as the southern terminus for weekend J. After a reconfiguration of the Nassau Street Line in 2004, the eastern (former "northbound") platforms were abandoned and the platform-level connection was removed, allowing the former southbound express track to continue south. The westernmost (former "southbound") platform remains in operation and both tracks provide through service with southbound traffic using the former southbound "local" track and northbound traffic using the former southbound "express" track.

The former northbound local track is now used only for non-revenue moves, train storage and emergencies while the northbound express stub track was removed. The former northbound "local" track merges with the former southbound "express" track (now the northbound track) south of the station.

In 2004, this opening was sealed with new tiling as the eastern platform was in the process of being closed.

South of this station there are unused stub tracks that lead from Chambers Street and used to connect to the southern tracks of the Manhattan Bridge. These tracks were disconnected with the opening of the Chrystie Street Connection in 1967 and now end at bumper blocks.

BMT Broadway Line platforms 
The four platforms of Canal Street station, located on two levels, are depicted as the same station by the MTA on maps, but contain two distinct station codes. Both are a part of the BMT Broadway Line. The upper level, the Main Line platforms, is for local trains traveling to Lower Manhattan and Brooklyn via the Montague Street Tunnel. The lower level, the Bridge Line platforms, is for express trains to and from the Manhattan Bridge.

In an art installation entitled Empress Voyage February 22, 1794 (1998) by Bing Lee, the platforms feature mosaics containing Chinese characters, reflecting the station's location in Chinatown. The symbols on the red wall plaques mean "money" and "luck" and the "Canal Street" name tablet has ideographs that read "China" and "Town." The platform walls also feature the station's name translated into Chinese characters

Main Line platforms (upper level) 

The Canal Street station on the Main Line has four tracks and two side platforms. The outer local tracks, the only ones to stop at this station, provide through service via the Montague Street Tunnel. The R stops here at all times except late nights, when it is replaced by the N. The W stops here during weekdays.

The center tracks, which have never seen revenue service, begin at the unused lower level of City Hall and run north to here, dead-ending at bumper blocks about two-thirds of the way through. The center tracks can be used for layups, but this use has been completely made redundant with the nearby City Hall lower level being used as a layup yard instead.

Bridge Line platforms (lower level) 

The Canal Street station on the Manhattan Bridge route has two tracks and two side platforms. When it originally opened, this station was known as Broadway. The N stops here at all times except late nights, while the Q stops here at all times. Although technically located on the BMT Broadway Line, it was originally a distinct station from the main line, as the two stations were not directly connected. It is located on the lower level and oriented perpendicular to the other portions of the complex.

The original tile on this station read simply "Broadway" and there was a small either wood or metal sign attached to the wall beneath the tile name that read "Canal Street."

West of the station, the bridge tracks curve to the north, and ramp up between the tracks from the local upper level platform to form the express tracks. The tunnel continues straight ahead, past the diverge to the main line. Sitting on one of the trackways is a storage building.

East of the station, the tracks cross the south side of the Manhattan Bridge to enter Brooklyn. There are disused trackways leading to the north side tracks of the bridge, which trains from these platforms used to travel on. These tracks were disconnected with the opening of the Chrystie Street Connection in 1967 and no longer have rails or any other infrastructure.

Artwork detail

References

Further reading

External links 

nycsubway.org:

 
 
 
 nycsubway.org — Canal Street Canal Artwork by Alexander Brodsky (1997) (no longer in display)
 nycsubway.org — Empress Voyage 2/27/1784 Artwork by Bing Lee (1998)
 Early Rapid Transit in Brooklyn, 1878 to 1913
 Broadway Subway Now Open, Public Service Record, Volume IV, Number 9: September 1917
 Opening of the Broadway Subway, a collection of New York Times articles from 1918 regarding the then-new BMT Broadway Line

Google Maps Street View:

 Centre Street entrance south of Canal Street
 Canal Street and Lafayette Street entrance
 Canal Street and Broadway entrance
 IRT Lexington Avenue Line southbound platform
 BMT Nassau Street Line platform
 BMT Broadway Line platforms (Main Line; Upper Level)
 BMT Broadway Line platforms (Bridge Line; Lower Level)

Other:

 Station Reporter — Canal Street Complex
 Forgotten NY — Original 28 - NYC's First 28 Subway Stations
 MTA's Arts For Transit — Canal Street
 Abandoned Stations - Canal St east side platform (BMT Nassau/Centre Street Subway)

BMT Broadway Line stations
BMT Nassau Street Line stations
Broadway (Manhattan)
Chinatown, Manhattan
IRT Lexington Avenue Line stations
New York City Subway stations in Manhattan
New York City Subway transfer stations
SoHo, Manhattan
Tribeca